Florence Delay (born 19 March 1941 in Paris) is a French academician and actress.

Biography
The daughter of Marie-Madeleine Carrez and Jean Delay, Delay studied at the Lycée Jean de La Fontaine and then the Sorbonne.

In 1962, she played the title role of Joan of Arc in a movie by Robert Bresson, Procès de Jeanne d'Arc (The Trial of Joan of Arc). At 30, she published her first novel, Minuit sur les jeux. She was awarded the Prix Femina in 1983 for her novel Riche et légère. With Jacques Roubaud of the Oulipo, she compiled, a series of 10 plays about the Arthurian legend, Graal Théâtre, from 1977 to 2005.

She has been an actress, narrator, or writer in movies by Chris Marker, Hugo Santiago, Benoît Jacquot and Michel Deville. She was elected to the Académie française on 14 December 2000.

Bibliography
Minuit sur les jeux (1973)
Le aïe aïe de la corne de brume (1975)
Graal théâtre (in coll. with Jacques Roubaud, 1977–1981)
L’Insuccès de la fête (1980)
Riche et légère (1983)
Acte de la Passion, in Théâtre espagnol du XVIe siècle (1983)
Marco Polo, le nouveau livre des merveilles, (in coll. with Jean Marie Adiaffi, Sony Labou Tansi, Jacques Savoie, Louis Caron, Abdelaziz Kacem, Jacques Lacarrière, Bertrand Visage - 1985)
Course d’amour pendant le deuil (1986)
L'Éclypse de la balle, d’Arnaldo Calveyra (1987)
Il me semble, Mesdames ou Les Dames de Fontainebleau (1987)
Petites formes en prose après Edison (1987)
"La sortie au jour" in Le Livre sacré de l’ancienne Égypte (1987)
Le divin Narcisse, et autres textes, de Sor Juana Inès de la Cruz, (in coll. with Frédéric Magne and Jacques Roubaud, 1987)
La Décadence de l’analphabétisme, de José Bergamín (1988)
Partition rouge. Poèmes et chants des Indiens d’Amérique du Nord, (in coll. with Jacques Roubaud, 1988)
La Célestine (version courte), de Fernando de Rojas (1989)
La Solitude sonore du toreo, de José Bergamín (1989)
L’Hexaméron (in coll. with Michel Chaillou, Michel Deguy, Natacha Michel, Denis Roche, Jacques Roubaud, 1990)
Etxemendi (1990)
Semaines de Suzanne (in coll. with Patrick Deville, Jean Echenoz, Sonja Greenlee, Harry Mathew, Mark Polizzotti, Olivier Rolin, 1991)
Les Moitiés, de Ramón Gómez de la Serna, (in coll. with Pierre Lartigue, 1991)
Catalina, enquête (1994)
Œillet rouge sur le sable (1994)
La Fin des temps ordinaires (1996)
La Séduction brève (1997)
Six poèmes galiciens, de Federico García Lorca (1998)
L’Homme du Luxembourg, d’Arnaldo Calveyra (1998)
Beauténébreux, de José Bergamín (1999)
Dit Nerval, essai (1999)
Michée, Aggée, Zacharie, Malachie, (with Maurice Roger and Arnaud Sérandour, 2001)
Le Grand Théâtre du monde suivi de Procès en séparation de l’Âme et du Corps, de Pedro Calderón de la Basca (2004)
Mon Espagne. Or et Ciel, Hermann (2008)

Filmography 
 The Trial of Joan of Arc (1962)
 Le Jouet criminel (1969) (short)
 Collections privées (1979) (segment "Kusa-Meikyu", voice)
 Écoute voir... (1979)

External links
  L'Académie française
 

1941 births
Living people
Writers from Paris
University of Paris alumni
Members of the Académie Française
French women novelists
Prix Femina winners
French women dramatists and playwrights